The Pelican Latin American Library (PLAL) was a specialist series of books published by Penguin Books UK in the 1970s. The series was inaugurated in the wake of the success of another Penguin imprint, the Penguin African Library. The general editor of the series was Richard Gott, the longtime Latin America correspondent of the Guardian.

The series took off at a time when Latin American politics was buffeted by numerous challenges such as military dictatorship, American hegemony, widespread poverty, and guerrilla uprisings often inspired by Marxist liberation theology. The first book in the series was Carlos Marighela's For the Liberation of Brazil, translated by John Butt and Rosemary Sheed. Other titles published in the series were:

 Alain Labrousse, The Tupamaros
 Alain Gheerbrant, The Rebel Church in Latin America
 Andre Gunder Frank, Capitalism and Underdevelopment in Latin America
 Camilo Torres Restrepo, Revolutionary Priest
 Carlos Marighela, For the Liberation of Brazil
 Che Guevara, Guerrilla Warfare
 Fidel Castro, Fidel Castro Speaks
 Francisco Julião, Cambão - the Yoke: The Hidden Face of Brazil  
 Gerrit Huizer, Peasant Rebellion in Latin America
 Jean-Pierre Bernard et al.,  Guide to the Political Parties of South America
 John Womack Jr., Zapata and the Mexican Revolution 
 Marcel Niedergang, The Twenty Latin Americas, vols 1 and 2
 Miguel Arraes, Brazil: The People and the Power 
 Paul Gallet, Freedom to Starve
 Regis Debray, Revolution in the Revolution?
 Regis Debray, Strategy for Revolution 
 Richard Gott, Rural Guerrillas in Latin America
 Sven Lindqvist, The Shadow: Latin America Faces the Seventies
 Thomas Melville and Marjorie Melville, Guatemala – Another Vietnam?
 Victor Daniel Bonilla, Servants of God or Masters of Men?
 Salvador Allende, Chile's Road to Socialism 	

Due to the perception of leftist bias in the series, there was friction with the corporate owner Pearson Longman and the imprint was eventually ceased.

References

History of South America